Ocean One is a skyscraper proposed for construction at Jomtien Beach, close to Pattaya, Thailand. The proposed building site is 250 metres from one of Asia's most popular beaches. When completed, Ocean One will be the tallest building in Thailand. It is planned mainly for residential use, but will also have a conference centre.

The architects are Woods Bagot, who designed Q1 on Australia's Gold Coast which used to be the tallest residential building in the world. Construction has not yet begun, but is expected to take approximately four years from commencement to completion. There are important wind engineering and earthquake engineering problems that must be addressed by structural engineers (current contractor is Connell Wagner) prior to proceeding with construction. The construction contract is planned to be awarded to K-TECH.

The building is planned to include the latest in luxury and technology with a special focus on environmental aspects. Other features are the high security, a 24-hour medical clinic and 13 high speed lifts with a maximum waiting time of just 18 seconds. The entire 9th floor will be devoted to recreation with swimming pools, saunas, spas, gymnasiums and a running track. The building will have a two-level shopping plaza at the rear.

Siam Best Enterprises Co. Ltd., the developer of the Ocean 1 Tower, estimates that the building will be complete within four years of start of construction. Construction was supposed to have started in 2006 and be complete by 2009, but the start was delayed by a court case brought against the developers. Although the sale of apartments in the tower already started, the construction seems to be on hiatus as in November 2015.

See also
 List of tallest buildings in Thailand

References

External links
 Official website
 

Proposed skyscrapers
Skyscrapers in Thailand
Proposed buildings and structures in Thailand